Araik Rubikovich Ovsepyan (born 26 January 1995) is a Russian football player.

Career
Ovsepyan made his professional debut in the Russian Professional Football League for FC Sibir-2 Novosibirsk on 31 August 2014 in a game against FC Irtysh Omsk.

He made his Russian Football National League debut for FC Sibir Novosibirsk on 11 July 2016 in a game against FC Spartak-2 Moscow.

On 12 January 2017, Ovsepyan signed for FC Krasnodar until December 2021.

References

External links
 
 
 
 Career summary by sportbox.ru

1995 births
Sportspeople from Novosibirsk
Living people
Russian people of Armenian descent
Russian footballers
Association football midfielders
FC Sibir Novosibirsk players
FC Krasnodar-2 players